The Tunisian Women's Handball League or the National Women's Handball A League is the Tunisian women's handball Top Division. The league started in 1963, it is Rule by The Tunisian Handball Federation.
Club Africain is the dominant club with more than 28 titles record 17 of them are consecutive, Followed by ASF Sahel by 13 title and in third rank we find ASE Ariana by 7 titles, However The league serve as a Qualified Tournament to the African competitions such as Champions League and also the Cup Winners' Cup.

Winners list

Most successful clubs 

 Notes: : ASF Sahel old name was Zaoui Meubles Sports

See also 
Tunisian Handball League
Tunisian Handball Cup
Tunisian Women's Handball Cup

References

External links 
  Tunisia Handball INFO 
  League INFO 

Handball in Tunisia
Tunisia
Sports leagues established in 1963
1963 establishments in Tunisia